Caloptilia azaleella (azalea leaf miner) is a moth of the family Gracillariidae. It is endemic to Japan, but has been introduced worldwide, wherever there are Azaleas.

Distribution
Initially described in the Netherlands from plants imported from Japan, it is found throughout Europe and has also been introduced to New Zealand and eastern Australia. In the southern part of Britain it occurs in sheltered gardens including Buckingham Palace, the Royal Botanic Gardens, Kew and the Royal Horticultural Society Gardens, Wisley. It has been widely reported in greenhouses. In the United States the species can be found from Florida to Texas, and as far north as Long Island, West Virginia, and the Ohio Valley. On the west coast it is found in California, Washington and British Columbia, Canada.

Description
The type locality is from Boskoop, Netherlands, and was described in 1913, from moths reared on Azalea indica, a cultivar of Rhododendron indicum, which was imported from Japan. The moths forewings are mainly dark-brown with a yellow band along the costal margin.

Ecology
Caloptilia azaleella deposits its eggs on azalea (Rhododendron spp) plants, under leaves near the midrib. Thiese are the only hosts so far recorded. The larva initially forms a mine and later rolls the leaf downwards from the tip, forming a cone. When mature a pale-brown pupa is formed in a white, membranous silken cocoon spun beneath a leaf and the moths can mate a week later.

References

External links

 Lepiforum
 Azalea Leaf Miner at UKmoths

azaleella
Leaf miners
Moths described in 1913
Endemic fauna of Japan
Moths of Africa
Moths of Asia
Moths of Australia
Moths of Europe
Moths of Japan
Moths of New Zealand
Moths of North America